An eyebrow is a line of hair above the human eye.

Eyelash may also refer to:

Eyebrows (advertisement), a British advertising campaign for Cadbury chocolate 
Eyebrow, Saskatchewan, a village in the Canadian province of Saskatchewan
Rural Municipality of Eyebrow No. 193, Saskatchewan, the rural municipality that surrounds the village
The Eyebrow, a mountain in Montana
Monkey's Eyebrow, Kentucky, a rural community
Supercilium, a plumage feature, also known as the "eyebrow", of a bird
Head louse, an obligate ectoparasite, also known as Eyebrow lice
An eyebrow window

See also
 IBrowse,  a web browser for Amiga computers